André des Gachons (March 15, 1871 in Ardentes – July 13, 1951 in La Chaussée-sur-Marne) was a French painter and illustrator.

He exhibited at the Salon des Gachons from 1892 and at the Salon des Cent from January 1895. His use of watercolors were delicate. From 1913, in La Chaussee-sur-Marne, he painted weather observations each day at regular times, small watercolors; more than 77,000 were sent to the weather service in Paris. With his brother Jacques, Gachons published "l’Album des légendes" (“Livre des légendes”), a collection of poems, tales and legends.

References

External links
 

19th-century French painters
French male painters
20th-century French painters
20th-century French male artists
1871 births
1951 deaths
People from Indre
French illustrators
19th-century French male artists